The 1980–81 Maltese Premier League was the 1st season of the Maltese Premier League, and the 66th season of top-tier football in Malta.  It was contested by 8 teams, and Hibernians F.C. won the championship.

League standings

Results

References
Malta - List of final tables (RSSSF)

Maltese Premier League seasons
Malta
1980–81 in Maltese football